The New Mexico Charity Classic was a golf tournament on the Nike Tour. It ran from 1993 to 1994. In 1993, it was played at Valle Grande Golf Course in Santa Ana Pueblo, New Mexico. In 1994, it was played at the University of New Mexico Championship Course in Albuquerque, New Mexico.

In 1994, the winner earned $31,500.

Winners

See also
New Mexico Classic - a later NIKE Tour event

References

Former Korn Ferry Tour events
Golf in New Mexico
Sports in Albuquerque, New Mexico
Recurring sporting events established in 1993
Recurring events disestablished in 1994
1993 establishments in New Mexico
1994 disestablishments in New Mexico
Events in Albuquerque, New Mexico